Mark Hutchinson (born October 17, 1978) is a former Irish cricketer. He is a right-handed batsman. He represented Ireland A in three List A one-day cricket matches in the 2006 EurAsia cricket series.

Hutchinson was used as a middle to upper-order batsman, though finding form in the EurAsia tournament in the United Arab Emirates proved difficult for him as a right hand batsman.

External links
Mark Hutchinson at CricketArchive 

1978 births
Irish cricketers
Living people
People educated at Bangor Grammar School